Sarsawa is a town at the border of Haryana and a municipal board in Saharanpur district in the Indian state of Uttar Pradesh.

Sarsawa is a Nagar Palika Parishad town in Nakur tehsil district of Saharanpur, Uttar Pradesh. The Sarsawa city is divided into 25 wards for which elections are held every 5 years. The Sarsawa Nagar Palika Parishad has population of 18,956 of which 10,076 are males while 8,880 are females as per report released by Census India 2011.

History 
Sarsawa is listed in the Ain-i-Akbari as a pargana under Saharanpur sarkar, producing a revenue of 2,516,125 dams for the imperial treasury and supplying a force of 200 infantry and 30 cavalry. Its brick fort is also mentioned.

Nearest cities 
 Saharanpur
 Yamunanagar
 Chandigarh
 Dehradun
 Haridwar
 Roorkee
 New Delhi
 Ambala
 Muzzafarnagar
 Meerut

Demographics

At the 2011 Census of India, the population of children with age of 0–6 is 2466 which is 13.01% of total population of Sarsawa (NPP). In Sarsawa Nagar Palika Parishad, Female Sex Ratio is of 881 against state average of 912. Moreover, Child Sex Ratio in Sarsawa is around 820 compared to Uttar Pradesh state average of 902. Literacy rate of Sarsawa city is 79.40% higher than state average of 67.68%. In Sarsawa, Male literacy is around 85.21% while female literacy rate is 72.88%.

Schedule Caste (SC) constitutes 16.41% while Schedule Tribe (ST) were 0.02% of total population in Sarsawa (NPP).

Tourist attractions

 Airforce Station 
 ARC
 Yamuna (5 km away)
 Shri bhankhandi mahadev temple
 Kot- Opposite of Moh.Mirdhan Sarsawa

Transport 
Sarsawa is located in the state of Uttar Pradesh in India, about 98 mi (157 km) north of New Delhi, the country's capital. Saharanpur Bus Stand provides interstate bus services to several cities of Uttar Pradesh, Uttarakhand, Haryana, Punjab and Delhi.

Jolly Grant Airport, Dehradun, and Chandigarh Airport, Chandigarh, are the nearest airports to Sarsawa, though Sarsawa Air Force Station is used for some VIP transport.

Sarsawa railway station situated on Moradabad–Ambala line having railway services to numerous major cities across the country.

See also
Sarsawa (Assembly constituency)
Sarsawa Air Force Station

References

  

Cities and towns in Saharanpur district